Peter Persidis (8 March 1947 – 21 January 2009) was an international Austrian footballer.

Career
His father Kostas Persidis was also a footballer in Greece. He played at Proodeftiki F.C. (1937-1939) and Aris Piraeous (1943-1944).
Persidis started his professional career at First Vienna, than returned to his father's home country in the early 1970s, and went on to win three Greek titles with Olympiacos prior to returning to Vienna in 1975 to play for SK Rapid Wien. A sweeper, and the club's captain from 1978 to 1980, he won the 1981–82 Austrian title with Rapid under Hickersberger.

Coaching career
He coached VSE St. Pölten. He also later worked as Josef Hickersberger's assistant at Rapid and was briefly the club's caretaker manager. Persidis took over as Under-19 head coach last summer, having previously worked as assistant to Hickersberger at UEFA EURO 2008. However, he was forced to step down soon afterwards after being diagnosed with a serious illness.

Death
Persidis died in Vienna on 21 January 2009 at the age of 61, with the Austrian Football Association holding a minute's silence in his honour at the national team's friendly against Sweden in Graz on 11 February.

External links
 
 
 Profile - Rapidarchiv

References

1947 births
2009 deaths
Footballers from Vienna
Association football defenders
Austrian footballers
Austria international footballers
1978 FIFA World Cup players
Olympiacos F.C. players
SK Rapid Wien players
Austrian Football Bundesliga players
Expatriate footballers in Greece
Austrian people of Greek descent
Austrian football managers
SK Rapid Wien managers
Austrian expatriate footballers
Austrian expatriate sportspeople in Greece
SKN St. Pölten managers